Peter Alexander Rupert Carington, 6th Baron Carrington, Baron Carington of Upton,  (6 June 1919 – 9July 2018), was a British Conservative Party politician and hereditary peer who served as Defence Secretary from 1970 to 1974, Foreign Secretary from 1979 to 1982, Chairman of the General Electric Company from 1983 to 1984, and Secretary General of NATO from 1984 to 1988. In Margaret Thatcher's first government, he played a major role in negotiating the Lancaster House Agreement that ended the racial conflict in Rhodesia and enabled the creation of Zimbabwe.

Carrington was Foreign Secretary in 1982 when Argentina invaded the Falkland Islands. He took full responsibility for the failure to foresee this and resigned. As NATO secretary general, he helped prevent a war between Greece and Turkey during the 1987 Aegean crisis.

Following the House of Lords Act 1999, which removed the automatic right of hereditary peers to sit in the House of Lords, Carrington was created a life peer as Baron Carington of Upton.

Background and early life
The surname "Carrington" (with two r's) was adopted by royal licence dated 1839 by his direct male ancestor Robert Carrington, 2nd Baron Carrington, in lieu of Smith. The latter's father, Robert Smith, MP for Nottingham, was created Baron Carrington in 1796 (Peerage of Ireland) and 1797 (Peerage of Great Britain). The spelling of the surname was changed by royal licence to "Carington" (with one r) in 1880 by the 2nd Baron's sons, but the spelling of the title did not change.

Born in Chelsea on 6 June 1919, Peter Alexander Rupert Carington was the only son of the 5th Baron Carrington by his wife, the Hon. Sybil Marion Colville, a daughter of Charles Colville, 2nd Viscount Colville of Culross. He was a great-nephew of the Liberal statesman Charles Wynn-Carington, 1st Marquess of Lincolnshire, and also of politician and courtier the Hon. Sir William Carington. Brought up at Millaton House in Bridestowe, Devon, he was educated at two independent schools: Sandroyd School from 1928 to 1932, based at the time in the town of Cobham, Surrey (now the site of Reed's School), and Eton College. Upon leaving Eton, his housemaster, Cyril Butterwick, said of him, "For a really stupid boy, there are three possible professions: farming, soldiering and stockbroking".

Military service
Having trained at the Royal Military College, Sandhurst, Carrington was commissioned into the Grenadier Guards as a second lieutenant on 26 January 1939. He served with the regiment during the Second World War, promoted to lieutenant on 1 January 1941, and later temporary captain and acting major. Captain Lord Carrington played a key role as a tank commander during Operation Market Garden in the Netherlands in 1944; he led the first group of four Sherman tanks to reach the other side of the Nijmegen railway bridge across the Waal River. He was awarded the Military Cross (MC) on 1 March 1945 "in recognition of gallant and distinguished services in North West Europe". After the war, Carrington remained in the army until 1949.

Political career 1946–1982
In 1938, Carrington succeeded his father as 6th Baron Carrington. Although he became eligible to take his seat in the House of Lords on his 21st birthday in 1940, he was on active service at the time, and did not do so until 9 October 1945. After leaving the Army, he became involved in politics and served in the Conservative governments of Winston Churchill and Anthony Eden as Parliamentary secretary to the Minister of Agriculture and Food from November 1951 to October 1954. During the Crichel Down affair, which led to the resignation of Minister Thomas Dugdale, Carrington tendered his resignation, which was refused by the Prime Minister. Carrington then became Parliamentary Secretary to the Minister of Defence from October 1954 to October 1956. The latter year he was appointed High Commissioner to Australia, a post he held until October 1959. He was also appointed a Deputy lieutenant of Buckinghamshire on 2 July 1951. He became a Privy Counsellor in 1959.

Following his return to Britain he served under Harold Macmillan as First Lord of the Admiralty until October 1963. These were the years of the Royal Navy's Indian summer, and Carrington completed his education in high level defence, largely playing a secondary role, with former CNS Lord Mountbatten, 'Burma' to even other Sea Lords, as the last Royal CDS achieving the restoration of the Royal Navy to equal status with the Army and RAF, and securing major ship orders with guided missile destroyers replacing cruisers, and a large new nuclear submarine and Leander frigate building programme and interim retention of a large carrier programme. Carrington found Mountbatten impossibly vain and unrealistic in his pretensions, but thought that aircraft carriers and an amphibious task force allowing flexible intervention, and crucially easier withdrawal, than land forces, a better idea than the RAF 'island-hopping' alternative, believing that the Island bases would probably all have declared independence by 1975. The unrealistic nature of Mountbatten's large CVA01 carrier programme and Harold Macmillan's replacement as Prime Minister by Alec Douglas-Home, saw Carrington settle for Minister without Portfolio and Leader of the House of Lords under Douglas-Home until October 1964, when the Conservatives fell from power. From 1964 to 1970 he was Leader of the Opposition in the House of Lords.

When the Conservatives returned to power in 1970 under Edward Heath, Carrington became Defence Secretary, where he remained until 1974 when the Conservatives were voted out in favour of Harold Wilson's Labour. In a 1977 letter discussing the policy of torture of Irish republican internees during Operation Demetrius in August 1971, the then Home Secretary Merlyn Rees attributed the origins of the policy in particular to Carrington: '"It is my view (confirmed by Brian Faulkner before his death [NI's prime minister at the time]) that the decision to use methods of torture in Northern Ireland in 1971/72 was taken by ministers – in particular Lord Carrington, then secretary of state for defence."

Carrington had become Shadow Defence Secretary in 1968 after Enoch Powell was dismissed from the position following his controversial Rivers of Blood speech on immigration. He also served as Chairman of the Conservative Party from 1972 to 1974, and was briefly Secretary of State for Energy from January to March 1974.

Carrington was again Leader of the Opposition in the House of Lords from 1974 to 1979. In 1979 he was made Foreign Secretary and Minister for Overseas Development as part of the first Cabinet of Margaret Thatcher. Thatcher spoke very highly of Carrington, stating that "Peter had great panache and the ability to identify immediately the main points in any argument; and he could express himself in pungent terms. We had disagreements, but there were never any hard feelings."

Carrington chaired the Lancaster House conference in 1979, attended by Ian Smith, Abel Muzorewa, Robert Mugabe, Joshua Nkomo and Josiah Tongogara, which brought to an end Rhodesia's Bush War. He later expressed his support for Mugabe over Smith.

Carrington was Foreign Secretary when Argentina invaded the Falkland Islands on 2 April 1982. He resigned from the position on 5 April, taking full responsibility for the complacency of the Foreign and Commonwealth Office in its failure to foresee this development and for the misleading signals sent by the Foreign Office on British intentions for retaining control over the Falklands. In her autobiography, Margaret Thatcher was later to express her sorrow at his departure.  She had asked him to stay but he left because he and the Foreign Office were distrusted and even hated by many back-bench Conservatives, and in turn he despised the party for its pettiness.  Since his resignation, no other member of the House of Lords has held any of the four Great Offices of State.

Later life and death

Lord Carrington then served as Secretary General of NATO from 1984 to 1988. He was also appointed Chancellor of the Order of St Michael and St George on 1 August 1984, serving until June 1994.

In 1991, he presided over diplomatic talks about the breakup of Yugoslavia and attempted to pass a plan that would end the wars and result in each republic becoming an independent nation.

Apart from his political posts, he was the Chancellor of the University of Reading and served as chairman of several companies, including Christie's, and as a director of many others, including Barclays Bank, Cadbury Schweppes and The Daily Telegraph. He also chaired the Bilderberg conferences from 1990 to 1998, being succeeded in 1999 by Étienne Davignon. From 1983 to 2002, he was president of the Pilgrims Society, and from 1971 to 2018 the President of the Britain–Australia Society. He was appointed Chancellor of the Order of the Garter on 8 November 1994, a role from which he retired in October 2012.

After the House of Lords Act 1999 removed the automatic right of hereditary peers to sit in the House of Lords, Carrington, along with all former leaders of the House of Lords, was given a life peerage on 17 November 1999 as Baron Carington of Upton, of Upton in the County of Nottinghamshire. He was the longest-serving member of the House of Lords, and following the retirement of Lord Barber of Tewkesbury in 2016, had been the oldest. He was the second longest-serving member of the Privy Council after the Duke of Edinburgh.

He died on 9 July 2018, aged 99, of natural causes at his home in Bledlow, Buckinghamshire; his son Rupert succeeded him as 7th Baron Carrington.

A memorial service was held at Westminster Abbey on 31 January 2019.

Family

Lord Carrington married Iona McClean (19 March 1920 – 7 June 2009), daughter of Lt Col. Sir Francis McClean  and Aileen Wale, on 25 April 1942. They had three children: Alexandra de Bunsen  (born 1943), Virginia Carington  (born 1946; formerly married to Lord Ashcombe), and Rupert Carington, 7th Baron Carrington  (born 1948). Lord Carrington's wife, Lady Carrington, died on 7 June 2009, aged 89.

In popular culture
Carrington was a guest on BBC Radio 4's long-running programme Desert Island Discs in 1975 and on the same station's A Good Read in 2004.

In the 1977 war film A Bridge Too Far, John Stride played a Grenadier Guards captain at Nijmegen Bridge based on Carrington. This portrayal depicts the historical argument between Carrington and Major Julian Cook on whether to move forward along the "Hell's Highway" route.

In February 1982 Carrington was portrayed by Rowan Atkinson in a Not the Nine O'Clock News parody of Question Time, pedantically discussing an imminent nuclear holocaust.

Carrington was portrayed by James Fox in the 2002 BBC production of Ian Curteis's The Falklands Play.
He was also briefly portrayed by James Smith in the 2011 film The Iron Lady, and by Jeff Rawle in the 2014 play Handbagged.

Honours

1945: Military Cross
1958: Knight Commander of the Most Distinguished Order of Saint Michael and Saint George (KCMG)
1959: Lord of Her Majesty's Most Honourable Privy Council
1983: Companion of the Order of the Companions of Honour (CH)
1985: Knight Companion of the Most Noble Order of the Garter (KG); Chancellor of the Order (1994–2012)
1988: Knight Grand Cross of the Most Distinguished Order of Saint Michael and Saint George (GCMG); Chancellor of the Order (1984–1994)
1999: Life peerage, as Baron Carington of Upton
Knight Grand Cross of the Royal and Distinguished Spanish Order of Charles III
1988: Presidential Medal of Freedom
Department of Defense Medal for Distinguished Public Service
Freedom of the City of London

Honorary degrees 
1981: University of Cambridge (LL.D.)
1983: University of Essex (DUniv)
December 1989: University of Reading (D.Litt.)
1986: Harvard University (LL.D.)
1993: University of Nottingham (LL.D.)
14 December 1998: University of Newcastle upon Tyne (DCL)
21 November 2003: University of Oxford (DCL)

Arms

Bibliography
Reflect on Things Past – The Memoirs of Lord Carrington. Published by William Collins, 1988.

References

Further reading
 Bennett, Harry. "Lord Carrington, 1979–82." in British Foreign Secretaries Since 1974 (Routledge, 2004), pp. 131–154.
 Carrington, Peter Alexander Rupert Carington Baron. Reflect on things past: The memoirs of Lord Carrington (HarperCollins, 1988), a primary source.
 Kedourie, Elie. "False inevitabilities." American Scholar (1990) 59#3, pp. 462–468, review.
 Novak, Andrew. "Face-saving maneuvers and strong third-party mediation: the Lancaster house conference on Zimbabwe-Rhodesia." International Negotiation 14.1 (2009): 149–174. online
 Sharp, Paul. "The Thatcher-Carrington Partnership." in Thatcher's Diplomacy (Palgrave Macmillan, London, 1997), pp. 30–49.
 Tendi, Blessing-Miles. "Soldiers contra diplomats: Britain's role in the Zimbabwe/Rhodesia ceasefire (1979–1980) reconsidered." Small Wars & Insurgencies 26.6 (2015): 937–956.
 Yorke, Edmund. A Family Affair': the Lancaster House Agreement." in Diplomacy at the Highest Level (Palgrave Macmillan, 1996), pp. 200–219.

External links

 
Announcement of his taking the oath under his new title at the House of Lords House of Lords minutes of proceedings, 17 November 1999
 Lord Carrington's views on the EU from the Daily Telegraph
 Thatcher's First Cabinet
 Imperial War Museum Interview
 NATO Declassified – Lord Carrington (biography)
Lord Carrington obituary | Politics | The Guardian
The Papers of Lord Carrington, held at Churchill Archives Centre, Cambridge

|-

|-

|-

|-

|-

|-

|-

|-

|-

|-

|-

|-

|-

|-

|-

|-

|-

1919 births
2018 deaths
20th-century memoirists
Australia and New Zealand Banking Group
Peter
British Army personnel of World War II
British Secretaries of State for Foreign and Commonwealth Affairs
British people of the Falklands War
Chairmen of the Conservative Party (UK)
Chairmen of the Steering Committee of the Bilderberg Group
Chancellors of the Order of the Garter
Chancellors of the University of Reading
Carrington
Conservative Party (UK) hereditary peers
Conservative Party (UK) life peers
Deputy Lieutenants of Buckinghamshire
Diplomatic peers
First Lords of the Admiralty
Graduates of the Royal Military College, Sandhurst
Grenadier Guards officers
High Commissioners of the United Kingdom to Australia
Leaders of the House of Lords
Members of the Privy Council of the United Kingdom
Members of the Steering Committee of the Bilderberg Group
Military personnel from London
Ministers in the Eden government, 1955–1957
Ministers in the Macmillan and Douglas-Home governments, 1957–1964
Ministers in the third Churchill government, 1951–1955
People educated at Eton College
People educated at Sandroyd School
People from Buckinghamshire
Presidential Medal of Freedom recipients
Secretaries General of NATO
Secretaries of State for Defence (UK)
Peter
Life peers created by Elizabeth II
Carrington